Elections to Metropolitan Borough of Southwark were held in 1959.

The borough had ten wards which returned between 3 and 8 members. Labour won all the seats and no other party stood a full set of candidates.

Election result

|}

References

Council elections in the London Borough of Southwark
1959 in London
1959 English local elections